Constantino Manuel Torres, known as Manuel Torres, is an archaeologist and ethnobotanist specialising in the ethnobotany of pre-columbian South America and the Caribbean. In particular, he has shed much light on the Taíno use of Anadenanthera snuff Cohoba, its paraphernalia and associated archaeology.

Selected published works 

The Use of Anadenanthera colubrina var. Cebil by Wichi (Mataco) Shamans of the Chaco Central, Argentina. Yearbook for ethnomedicine and the study of consciousness 5: 41–58, with David Repke as second author. Verläg für Wissenschaft und Bildung, Berlin, (1998).
The role of cohoba in Taíno shamanism. Eleusis, n.s., no. 1: 38–50, Museo Civico di Rovereto, Trento, Italy, (1998).
Exploring the San Pedro de Atacama/Tiahuanaco Relationship. In Penny Dransart, ed., Andean Art -Visual Expression and its Relationship with Andean Values and Beliefs, Worldwide Archaeology Series vol. 13, pp. 78–108, with William J Conklin as second author, Avebury Press, Great Britain, (1995).
Iconografía Tiwanaku y Alucinógenos en San Pedro de Atacama: Sus Implicaciones para el Estudio del Horizonte Medio Andino. In Josep María Fericgla, ed., Plantas, chamanismo y estados de consciencia, pp. 151–173, Los Libros de la Liebre de Marzo, Barcelona, Catalunya, Spain, (1994).
Snuff Powders from Pre-Hispanic San Pedro de Atacama: Chemical and Contextual Analysis. Co-authored with D. Repke, K. Chan, D. McKenna, A. Llagostera, and R. E. Schultes. Current Anthropology 32(5): 640–649, University of Chicago Press, (1991).
The Iconography of South American Snuff Trays and Related Paraphernalia. Etnologiska Studier Series, no. 37, 305 pp., 193 plates. Göteborgs Etnografiska Museum, Sweden, (1987).
Anadenanthera: Visionary Plant of Ancient South America. Co-authored with David B. Repke. Haworth Press, (2005)

External links
 Florida International University faculty profile

21st-century Chilean botanists
Anthropology writers
Living people
Year of birth missing (living people)
Ethnobotanists
Chilean archaeologists
American archaeologists
20th-century Chilean botanists